Polyacanthia medialis is a species of beetle in the family Cerambycidae. It was described by Sharp in 1886, originally under the genus Poecilippe.

References

Pogonocherini
Beetles described in 1886